Bhalchandra Trimbak Ranadive (19 December 1904 – 6 April 1990), popularly known as BTR, was an Indian communist politician and trade union leader.

Personal life 
He was elder brother of Ahilya Rangnekar, a CPI-M leader and 6th Lok Sabha member from Mumbai North Central (Lok Sabha constituency). They belonged to a Marathi Chandraseniya Kayastha Prabhu(CKP) family but Ranadive, a brilliant student, would teach Dalit students in his spare time.

Political career 
Ranadive completed his studies in 1927, obtaining an M.A. degree with distinction and in 1928 he joined the clandestine Communist Party of India. In the same year he became a major leader of the All India Trade Union Congress in Bombay. He was active with the Girini Kamgar Union of the textile workers in Bombay and with the struggles of the railway workers. He became the secretary of the GIP Railwaymen’s Union. In 1939, he married Vimal, a trade union activist.

In 1943 he was elected to the central committee of the party. In February 1946 Ranadive played a major role in organizing a general strike in support of the Naval ratings revolt.

At its 2nd Party Congress held in Calcutta in February, 1948 the party elected Ranadive in place of P.C. Joshi as its general secretary. Ranadive was the general secretary of CPI 1948-1950. During that period the party was engaged in revolutionary uprisings, such as the Telangana armed struggle. In 1950 Ranadive was deposed, and denounced by the party as a "left adventurist".

In 1956, at the 4th Party Congress in Palghat BTR was again included in the Central Committee. He became a leading figure of the leftist section of the CC.

At the time of the Indo-China border conflict in 1962, Ranadive was one of many prominent communist leaders jailed by the government. In 1964 he became one of the main leaders of Communist Party of India (Marxist).

At the founding conference of the Centre of Indian Trade Unions in Calcutta May 28–31 1970, Ranadive was elected president.

Commemoration 
The central building of CITU in New Delhi is named after him— BTR Bhavan.

References

External links

Indian independence activists
Communist Party of India (Marxist) politicians from Maharashtra
Trade unionists from Maharashtra
Marathi politicians
1904 births
1990 deaths